Miami Platja (literally "Miami Beach") is a coastal resort about 30 km south of Tarragona, in southern Catalonia, Spain. It consists mainly of holiday apartments and villas, with a few hotels. A large area between the coast road and railway and the two motorways further inland is filled with holiday homes built in rows along wide streets.

References
Mapa Comarcal de Catalunya, Institut Cartogràfic de Catalunya, Barcelona, 2004

Municipalities in the Province of Tarragona
Populated places in the Province of Tarragona